The Title Guarantee and Trust Company Building is an Art Deco style highrise building on Pershing Square in Downtown Los Angeles. It was built in 1930 on the site of the California Club building. The building was designed by The Parkinsons, who also designed many Los Angeles landmarks, including Los Angeles City Hall and Bullocks Wilshire.  Originally an office building, the structure was later converted into lofts.  In 1984 the building was listed in the National Register of Historic Places.

In Popular Culture
Location shots of the building were featured in the CBS television drama series Lou Grant (1977–82), in which it was represented as the home of the Los Angeles Tribune, the fictional newspaper around which the series was based. Vampire P.I. Mick St. John purportedly lived and maintained his office on the top floor of the building in CBS' Vampire P.I. Drama, Moonlight (2007-2008).

See also
 List of Registered Historic Places in Los Angeles

References

External links

Buildings and structures in Downtown Los Angeles
Residential skyscrapers in Los Angeles
Los Angeles Historic-Cultural Monuments
Commercial buildings on the National Register of Historic Places in Los Angeles
Commercial buildings completed in 1930
1930 establishments in California
1930s architecture in the United States
John and Donald Parkinson buildings
Art Deco architecture in California